This is a list of awards and nominations received by American actress and director Regina King.

In the early 2000s, Regina King began acting as a supporting actress in the films Ray, Miss Congeniality 2: Armed and Fabulous and Down to Earth. Since the 2010s she has received critical acclaim for her roles in the television series Southland, receiving multiple Critics' Choice Television Award nominations and winning two NAACP Image Awards, and American Crime, which garnered her two Primetime Emmy Awards and her first Golden Globe nomination.

In 2018, she took part in the film If Beale Street Could Talk, thanks to which she won critical acclaim from film critics, being recognized with her first Academy Awards, Golden Globe and Critics' Choice Movie Award for Best Supporting Actress. Between 2018 and 2019 she starred in the television series Seven Seconds and Watchmen, which each earned her an Primetime Emmy Award for Outstanding Lead Actress in a Limited Series or Television Movie and the TCA Award for Individual Achievement in Drama.

In 2020, Regina King debuted as film director with One Night in Miami..., which receiving critical support, with nominations at the Golden Globe and Critics' Choice Movie Awards in the categories of Best Director.

Major associations

Academy Awards

Directors Guild Awards

Golden Globe Awards

Primetime Emmy Awards

Screen Actors Guild Awards

Other awards and nominations

BET Awards

Black Reel Awards

Critics' Choice Movie Awards

Critics' Choice Super Awards

Critics' Choice Television Awards

Gotham Awards

Independent Spirit Awards

NAACP Image Awards

National Board of Review

National Society of Film Critics

Peabody Award

Satellite Awards

Saturn Awards

Teen Choice Awards

Critics awards

References

External links
 

Lists of awards received by American actor
Lists of awards received by film director